James Conrad Risser (born 1946) is an American philosopher and Professor of Philosophy at Seattle University. He was Pigott-McCone Endowed Chair of Humanities between 1991 and 1994 and the president of the North American Society of Philosophical Hermeneutics (2012–2015).

Books
 The Life of Understanding: A Contemporary Hermeneutics. (Bloomington: Indiana University Press, 2012)
 (Edited) American Continental Philosophy. Edited by Walter Brogan and James Risser. (Bloomington: Indiana University Press, 2000)
 (Edited) Heidegger Toward the Turn: The Work of the 1930s. (Albany: SUNY Press, 1999)
 Hermeneutics and the Voice of the Other: Re-reading Hans-Georg Gadamer's Philosophical Hermeneutics (Albany: SUNY Press, 1997)

References

American philosophers
Philosophy academics
Living people
Gadamer scholars
1946 births
Seattle University faculty
Duquesne University alumni
Hermeneutists